Chenar-e Arabha (also Romanized as Chenār-e ‘Arabhā) is a village in Tarrud Rural District, in the Central District of Damavand County, Tehran Province, Iran. At the 2006 census, its population was 330, in 93 families.

References 

Populated places in Damavand County